Paracyphononyx is a genus of spider wasps distributed in the tropics and warmer temperate regions; they differ from other pompilids in that they do not permanently disable the host spider but allow the spider to resume activity after the wasp has laid its egg on the spider while the wasp larva exists as koinobiont ectoparasitoid of the spider.

Species
There are 51 species currently recognised in Paracophonyx and some of these are listed below with the areas where they have been recorded from.

Paracyphononyx affinis Haupt, 1929 Cameroon, Ghana, Uganda, Ecuador
Paracyphononyx africanus Rad., 1881 Angola, Democratic Republic of Congo, Uganda, Zimbabwe
Paracyphononyx alienus Smith, 1879 Japan
Paracyphononyx amoenissimus Dalla Torre Brazil
Paracyphononyx ater Priesner, 1955 Egypt
Paracyphononyx capensis Arnold, 1959 South Africa
Paracyphononyx carinatus Rad., 1881 Angola, Sierra Leone, South Africa, Zimbabwe
Paracyphononyx coloratus Haupt, 1929 Cameroon
Paracyphononyx consimilis Smith, 1879 Australia
Paracyphononyx diabolicus Holmberg Brazil, Paraguay, Argentina
Paracyphononyx difficilis Bischoff, 1913 Mali, South Africa, Uganda, Zimbabwe)
Paracyphononyx diversipes Arnold, 1962 Zimbabwe
Paracyphononyx diversus Dahlbom, 1845 Central and East Africa to South Africa, Yemen
Paracyphononyx elliotti Saussure Madagascar
Paracyphononyx fairchildi Banks, 1947 Brazil
Paracyphononyx frustratus Smith, 1879 South Africa, Uganda, Zimbabwe
Paracyphononyx funebris Magretti, 1884 Ethiopia
Paracyphononyx funereus Lepeletier, 1845 eastern and central United States of America
Paracyphononyx furibundus Kohl, 1894 Central Asia
Paracyphononyx gemellus Arnold, 1936 South Africa, Zimbabwe
Paracyphononyx incalis Banks, 1947 Peru
Paracyphononyx incognitus Cameron, 1891 Philippines
Paracyphononyx laboriosus Arnold, 1936 Ethiopia, South Africa
Paracyphononyx languidus Haupt, 1929 South Africa, Zimbabwe
Paracyphononyx metemmensis Magretti, 1884 Ghana, Mali, South Africa, Zimbabwe
Paracyphononyx minor Banks, 1947 Brazil
Paracyphononyx mombassicus R. Luc., 1898 Kenya
Paracyphononyx montanus Arnold, 1960 South Africa
Paracyphononyx neriene Banks, 1947 Argentina
Paracyphononyx parallelus Haupt, 1929 Democratic Republic of Congo, South Africa
Paracyphononyx pedestris Smith, 1885 Philippines
Paracyphononyx petiolaris Saussure, 1891 Madagascar
Paracyphononyx plutonis Banks, 1940 Madagascar
Paracyphononyx rothneyi Cameron, 1891 India
Paracyphononyx rotundinervis Cameron, 1910 Ethiopia, Tanzania, Uganda
Paracyphononyx ruficrus Klug, 1834 Asia Minor, Egypt, South Africa, Yemen, Zimbabwe
Paracyphononyx scapulatus Brethes, South America
Paracyphononyx semiplumbeus Taschenberg, 1869 Brazil, Argentina
Paracyphononyx sericeus Banks, 1947 Brazil
Paracyphononyx serraticornis Taschenberg, Brazil
Paracyphononyx sulcatus Fox, Brazil
Paracyphononyx unicolor Smith, 1879 Panama
Paracyphononyx vivax Cameron, 1891 India
Paracyphononyx wroughtoni Cameron, 1891 India
Paracyphononyx zavattarii Guiglia, 1943 Canary Islands
Paracyphononyx zonatus Illiger, 1802 Mali, South Africa, Zimbabwe

References